Olsi Rama is the General Director of Football Club Partizani Tirana. Previously he worked as scientific researcher and project manager at the Barbara Ann Karmanos Cancer Institute in Detroit, Michigan.

Career
Olsi played like his brother Edi Rama for Dinamo Tirana basketball till 1996. From 1993-1997 he was Program Officer of the Open Society Foundation for Albania (Soros Foundation) where he was in charge of the Youth, Health, Libraries and the East-East programs. Olsi moved to the United States in April 1997, after his life was threatened by the secret service because of his involvement with Soros, his activity as a journalist with WorldWide Television News (WTN), and his affiliation with other foreign journalist covering the Albanian insurrection. During his stay in USA, Olsi worked as program manager at the Karmanos Cancer Institute in Detroit, MI, one of the 49 comprehensive cancer centers in the United States. In addition, Olsi has also worked as a consultant with SciTech Development LLC, a drug development start-up from Detroit. He has helped SciTech with several projects and with their contract negotiations with the National Cancer Institute and the National Institutes of Health

Controversies
After the clashes in the European Championship qualifier between Serbia and Albania, Olsi Rama was temporarily arrested. According to the Serbian Ministry of Interior, Olsi Rama is said to have controlled the drone with an Greater Albanian flag remotely from his VIP box. 
Rama, who also has a US passport according to media reports, was finally able to travel back to Tirana together with the Albanian team. Why Rama could not be taken into custody, was established in Belgrade legal circles with the more than a month lasting strike of lawyers.

On his arrival in Tirana, Rama said he was neither arrested nor questioned. "I do not understand where that comes from."

References

1969 births
American people of Albanian descent
Scientists from Detroit
Living people